Lara George (born 23 June 1978), known professionally as a US-based Nigerian gospel singer, songwriter and producer. She started her music career at the University of Lagos and was a member of the disbanded musical group Kush. Her debut album Forever In My Heart was released in 2008 and included the hit single "Ijoba Orun," which earned her several awards and nominations. She has performed at notable events and appeared on BET International as one of the first Nigerian artists to be aired on that show. She is married with two children and lives in Alpharetta, Georgia in the United States. Additionally, she is the Vice President of SoForte Entertainment Distribution Ltd., the first home-grown structured entertainment distribution company in Nigeria.

Early life and education
Lara George was born on 23 June 1978 into the family of Oluwole Bajomo in Lagos State, the administrative division of Nigeria. She attended Queen's College, Lagos before proceeding to the University of Lagos, where she obtained a master's degree in architecture.

Career 
George began her music career at the University of Lagos, where she joined the campus fellowship choir. She was a member of the disbanded musical group Kush. Her debut album, titled Forever In My Heart, included the hit single "Ijoba Orun" which was released in 2008. The album earned her several awards and nominations. In 2008, she won Voice of the Year at the Nigeria Music Awards. In 2010, she was awarded Best Vocals Performance (Female) in the industry-wide 'Headies' awards, now renamed 'Hip-Hop World Awards' in Nigeria. She emerged the winner of the Best African Female Gospel Artiste category at the 2011 Africa Gospel Music Awards held in London, UK. George has also been named Trailblazer of the Year, Africa Gospel Music Awards, nominated in the 2016 edition of the prestigious pan-African Kora Awards as Best Female Artiste West Africa, and also Gospel Artiste of the Year, Ben TV Awards UK, amongst many other awards.

George has performed in various notable events including the GreenBelt Festival UK (as part of KUSH), one of Africa's largest musical concerts with attendance of over 500,000 people- The Experience- alongside notable gospel artistes such as Ron Kenoly, Bebe, Cece Winans, Micah Stampley, Don Moen and Mary Mary. Other performances include the Calabar Festival, MTN Music Festival, Festival of Life UK, Festival of Life Canada, amongst many others.

George appeared on BET International as one of the first artistes from Nigeria to be aired on that show. She was a member of the BET Voting Academy for two years in a row. She served as a judge on the music TV show Airtel TRACE MUSIC Star.

Personal life
She is married to Gbenga George, a legal practitioner and music entrepreneur.  She has two children: a boy named Adeoba and a girl named Tiaraoluwa and lives in Alpharetta, Georgia in the United States.

Discography

Albums 
Forever In My Heart (2008)
Lara George (2009)
Higher - The Dansaki Album (2012)
Love Nwantintin (2014)
The Medley Album (2014)
A Slice of Heaven (2017)
Daddy's Girl (2021)

Singles 
 You Alone Oluwa Medley (2014)
 Total Surrender (2016)
 Lara George Praise Medley (2016)
  Kolebaje Medley (2016)
 Eyin L'oba (2016)
 Nobody Greater (2016)

Covers 
 "Hello" (Adele cover) (2015)

Awards and nominations

See also
 List of Nigerian gospel musicians

References

Living people
Musicians from Lagos
People from Lagos State
Nigerian gospel singers
University of Lagos alumni
English-language singers from Nigeria
Yoruba-language singers
Yoruba women musicians
Queen's College, Lagos alumni
1970 births
1978 births
American people of Nigerian descent
American people of Yoruba descent
Nigerian women singers